The following is a list of notable people associated with the University of Detroit Mercy, located in the American city of Detroit, Michigan.

Notable alumni

Academics
 Andreas Blass, mathematician and professor at University of Michigan
 Kevin Boyle, winner of 2004 National Book Award  for Arc of Justice: A Saga of Race, Civil Rights, and Murder in the Jazz Age; Professor of History at Ohio State University
 Thomas Budzynski, psychologist and a pioneer in the field of biofeedback
 John A. DiBiaggio, former president of University of Connecticut, Michigan State University and Tufts University
 Dudley Randall, poet, librarian, poet-in-residence

Acting, theater, film and television 
 Anita Barone, actress
 Phil Cousineau, author, lecturer, independent scholar, screenwriter, and documentary filmmaker   
 Pamela Anne Eldred, Miss America 1970
 David Patrick Kelly, actor
 Keegan-Michael Key, actor (Key & Peele, madTV, Animal Planet)
 Connie Kreski (Kornacki), actress, 1969 Playboy Playmate of the Year
 Allison Payne, news anchor
 Ted Raimi, actor, best known for his roles on seaQuest DSV and Xena: Warrior Princess
 Amy Yasbeck, actress

Business
 W. James Farrell, Chairman and CEO, Illinois Tool Works, 1995–2005
 A. C. Muthiah, Chairman-Emeritus of Southern Petrochemical Industries Limited (SPIC); Chairman of Sri Venkateswara College of Engineering (SVCE) 
 Thomas Thewes, co-founder, Compuware Corporation

Engineering

J. Thomas McCarthy
Otmar Szafnauer, COO Sahara Force India Formula 1 Team; former programs manager at Ford

Journalism and writing
Bill Bonds, former longtime anchor of WXYZ-TV news
Ron Fournier, Associated Press, chief of Washington bureau
Elmore Leonard, author, several of whose books have been made into movies, such as Get Shorty, Be Cool, and The Big Bounce
J. P. McCarthy, former radio host on Detroit station WJR
George Noory, syndicated radio talk show host (Coast to Coast AM)
Allison Payne, former anchorwoman with WGN-TV, Chicago

Government and politics
Richard Arrington, Jr., first African American mayor of Birmingham, Alabama
Tina BrooksGreen, Chief Judge of the 34th District Court Romulus, Michigan
Donald W. Banner, former United States Commissioner of Patents and Trademarks
Thomas E. Brennan, Justice of the Michigan Supreme Court (1967–1973); served as Chief Justice from 1969–1970; founded the Thomas M. Cooley Law School
Vincent M. Brennan, Michigan politician
James H. Brickley, 54th and 56th Lieutenant Governor of Michigan and a justice of the Michigan Supreme Court from 1982–1999
Vern Buchanan, Republican Congressman representing Florida's 16th congressional district
Tim Burns, Michigan politician
Pamela Carter, 38th Indiana Attorney General (1993–1997)
Michael F. Cavanagh, Justice of the Michigan Supreme Court, 1982–present (served as Chief Justice from 1991 to 1995)
Jerome Cavanagh, Mayor of Detroit, 1962-1970
Bob Constan, Michigan State House of Representatives
Maura D. Corrigan, director, Michigan Department of Human Services; former Justice of the Michigan Supreme Court, 1998–2011 (served as Chief Justice from 2001 to 2004)
George Cushingberry, Jr., Michigan House of Representatives
James Dinkins, Executive Associate Director of Homeland Security Investigations from 2010 to 2014
Robert A. Ficano, county executive of Wayne County, Michigan, 2013–2015
Roman S. Gribbs, mayor of Detroit, 1970–1974, Judge of the Michigan Court of Appeals
Frank J. Kelley, longest-serving Attorney General in Michigan history (1961 to 1998)
Theodore Levin, U.S. District Court Judge (1946 to 1970); father of Charles and Joseph Levin; uncle of Senator Carl Levin and Representative Sander Levin
Greg Mathis, retired Michigan 36th District Court judge and syndicated television show judge
E. Michael McCann, former Milwaukee County District Attorney
Thaddeus McCotter, former Member of the U.S. House of Representatives from Michigan's 11th congressional district (2003–2012)
Zenaida Moya, Mayor of Belize City, Belize, 2006–2012
L. Brooks Patterson, lawyer and politician, formerly the County Executive of Oakland County, Michigan
Gary Peters, United States Senator from Michigan, former member of the U.S. House of Representatives from Michigan's 9th congressional district
Haider Abbas Rizvi, former member of the National Assembly of Pakistan; a senior leader of the Muttahida Qaumi Movement (MQM) party
James L. Ryan, retired Justice of the Michigan Supreme Court, 1975–1985; Judge of the U.S. Court of Appeals, 6th Circuit, 1985–present
Thomas Patrick Thornton, United States Federal Judge

Military and space
Richard F. Abel, former United States Air Force Brig. General
Paul Bikle, former Director of the NASA Flight Research Center
Robert J. Elder, Jr, former United States Air Force Lt. General
Glynn Lunney, NASA flight director

Religion
Joseph M. Breitenbeck, eighth Bishop of Grand Rapids, from 1969 to 1989
Joseph Cassidy, Anglican priest
Gary Habermas, PhD, philosophical theologian and apologist; defender of Christ's historical Resurrection
 Dario Hunter, first Muslim-born person to be ordained a rabbi
Dale Joseph Melczek, third Bishop of Gary, since 1996
Robert A. Mitchell, 1st Chancellor of University of Detroit Mercy (1990–2)
Steven J. Raica, fifth Bishop of Gaylord, since 2014
Francis R. Reiss, auxiliary Bishop of Detroit, since 2003
Jane Dewar Schaberg (1977-April 17 2012) Professor of Religious Studies and Women's Studies

Sports
Grady Alderman, offensive lineman for 1969 NFL champion Minnesota Vikings and General Manager of Denver Broncos
John Barrett (1899-1966), professional football player
Dan Boisture (1925-2007), coach of Eastern Michigan (1967–73) and Detroit Wheels (1974) football teams
Lloyd Brazil (1906-65), U of D coach and athletic director
Frank Bucher (1900-70), professional football player
Wes Carlson, professional football player
Walt Cassidy (1899-1944), professional football player
Gus Cifelli (1926-2009), football player for Notre Dame and 1952 NFL champion Detroit Lions
Earl Cureton, NBA player for Philadelphia 76ers, Houston Rockets, Detroit Pistons, 2-time NBA champion
Dave DeBusschere (1940-2003), NBA Hall of Fame, played basketball for Detroit Pistons and New York Knicks, coach of Pistons; also played baseball for Chicago White Sox
Terry Duerod, former NBA player, Detroit Pistons, Boston Celtics
Bill Ebben, former NBA player
Andrew "Anvil Andy" Farkas (1916-2001), player for 1942 NFL champion Washington Redskins
Tom Finnin, former NFL player for Baltimore Colts
Willie Green, basketball player for NBA's Orlando Magic, assistant coach Golden State Warriors, head coach New Orleans Pelicans.
Jody Handley, soccer player for England women's national football team
Spencer Haywood, U of D basketball player, Olympic gold medalist, 4-time NBA All-Star, Basketball Hall of Fame
Dave Hill (1937-2011), PGA Tour golfer with 13 tour wins
Lee Knorek (1921-2003), NBA player for New York Knicks
Joe Kopicki, professional basketball player
Dutch Lauer (1898-1978), professional football player
John Long, professional basketball player, member of 1989 NBA champion Detroit Pistons
Bruce Maher, former NFL player for Detroit Lions
Ted Marchibroda (1931-2016), twice head coach of NFL's Baltimore Colts/Indianapolis Colts, offensive co-ordinator for Buffalo Bills Super Bowl teams
Ray McCallum, Jr., NBA player for San Antonio Spurs 
Bob Miller (1926-2020), former MLB player (1949–58) and U-D baseball coach (1965–2000); career Titans coaching record of 896-780-2; named to Titans Hall of Fame 1979
Guy Murray, Detroit Titans cross country/track and field head coach
Dorie Murrey, NBA player for Detroit Pistons, Seattle SuperSonics
A. C. Muthiah, president of Board of Control for Cricket in India from 1999 to 2001
Tip O'Neill (1898-1984), professional football player
Andrew Ornoch, Mississauga Eagles FC
Chase Simon (born 1989), basketball player for Maccabi Ashdod of the Israeli Basketball Premier League
Jimmy Simpson (1897-1979), professional football player
Gino Sovran (1924-2016), professional basketball player
Guy Sparrow, former NBA player for New York Knicks
Art Stolkey (1920-2013), professional basketball player
Terry Thomas (1953-98), former NBA player
Terry Tyler, NBA player for Detroit Pistons, Sacramento Kings
Owen Wells (1950-93), professional basketball player

Notable faculty
Richard Buckminster "Bucky" Fuller, visiting professor in the School of Architecture at University of Detroit, 1970
 Robert S. Johnston (1901–1902), classics, English, and mathematics teacher; later president of Saint Louis University
 John P. McNichols, S.J., Jesuit priest and 11th president of University of Detroit from 1921 to 1932; established the McNichols Campus, and is the namesake for McNichols Road in Detroit
Frank Murphy, law instructor; Michigan jurist; Mayor of Detroit; Governor of Michigan; the last Governor-General of the Philippines; and the first High Commissioner of the Philippines, United States Attorney General, and United States Supreme Court Associate Justice
 Joyce Carol Oates, taught at the University of Detroit; published her first novel, With Shuddering Fall, when she was 26 years old; her novel them received the National Book Award in 1970; has taught at Princeton University since 1978
 Dick Vitale, basketball coach and broadcaster, was head coach of Detroit Titans men's basketball from 1973-77
 Isaiah McKinnon

References

External links
University of Detroit Mercy Alumni Association

University of Detroit Mercy
University of Detroit Mercy people
University of Detroit Mercy people